Jack Strong may refer to:
 Jack Strong (film), a 2014 Polish political thriller film
 CIA pseudonym of  Colonel Ryszard Kukliński, a Cold War-era Polish spy for NATO
 Jack Strong (footballer) (1884–?), Australian rules footballer
 Jack Strong, bassist with The Acacia Strain
 Jack Boynton Strong (1930–2015), American politician

See also
 John Strong (disambiguation)

Strong, Jack